Mukhlesur Rahman Bangladesh Nationalist Party politician. He was elected a member of parliament from Gaibandha-3 in February 1996.

Career 
Mukhlesur was elected to parliament from Gaibandha-3 as a Bangladesh Nationalist Party candidate in 15 February 1996 Bangladeshi general election.

References 

Living people
Year of birth missing (living people)
People from Gaibandha District
Bangladesh Nationalist Party politicians
6th Jatiya Sangsad members